Juan Lechín Oquendo (18 May 1914 – 27 August 2001) was a labor-union leader and head of the Federation of Bolivian Mine Workers (FSTMB) from 1944 to 1987 and the Bolivian Workers' Union (COB) from 1952 to 1987. He also served as the 29th vice president of Bolivia between 1960 and 1964.

Early life
Lechín was born to a Lebanese immigrant father and a Bolivian mother in Corocoro, a city in the Department of La Paz. He worked in the Catavi and Siglo XX tin mines, both of which were owned by the mining tycoon Simón Iturri Patiño. While working as a machinist in the mines, he was made aware of the desperate conditions of the vast majority of the highland workers.

Career and labor activism
In the 1940s he became involved in the nascent labor movement and joined the Revolutionary Workers' Party (POR), a Trotskyist political party. 

In 1944, Lechín led a congress of miners in Huanuni, Oruro, that led to the formation of the FSTMB. Lechín was elected the union's Executive Secretary. At this point, he became affiliated with the Revolutionary Nationalist Movement (MNR), though he maintained good relations with the Trotskyist POR. 

Following the 1952 Bolivian National Revolution, Lechín was chosen as Minister of Mines and Petroleum. He also led the founding congress of the Central Obrera Boliviana (COB), an umbrella federation of labor unions, and was elected its Executive Secretary. Since he had played a vital role in the Revolution, and had advocated the permanent extension of weapons to the workers' militias to guarantee regime stability against the possibility of an oligarchic/military backlash, he became extremely popular with the poorer sectors of society. Indeed, he was the most charismatic and popular MNR leader other than Víctor Paz Estenssoro. In addition, he was of far more radical political persuasion (Marxist-inspired) than the rest of the government leadership. This inevitably led to growing intra-party tensions and disagreements over labor issues and personal ambitions.

In frank disagreement with what he saw as the increasingly conservative policies of president Hernán Siles Zuazo, by the late 1950s Lechín had begun to form a left-wing opposition within the ruling party. To reduce these tensions and prevent fragmentation, Paz was persuaded to return from retirement and lead the MNR in the 1960 presidential elections. The conciliatory Paz chose Lechín as his vice-presidential candidate, apparently with a promise that Lechín would be the presidential candidate in 1964. 

Instead, Lechín's intransigence on political issues eventually convinced Paz not only to reneg on his promise but also to expel vice-president Lechín from the MNR at its 1964 convention. At that point, Lechín formed the Revolutionary Party of the National Left (PRIN).

Repeated exile
Rather surprisingly, Juan Lechín—the firebrand of the left—supported the 1964 military coup that toppled the MNR from power. Soon thereafter, however, he was forced into exile. He returned in 1971 and was elected as head of the Popular Assembly, a revolutionary congress endorsed by the reform-minded general General Juan José Torres. Once more Lechín's role was polarizing, as he attempted to create a parallel (union and Assembly-based, quite reminiscent of soviets) alternative to the established order. After the Torres's overthrow later that year, Lechín was exiled once again and did not return until the democratic opening of 1978. By then the years had caught up with him and he had lost much luster and electoral appeal on a nationwide basis. He remained extremely popular with the miners, however, and once more he was elected to lead them and to chair the powerful Bolivian Workers' Union (COB). In 1980 he was the PRIN candidate for President and fared rather poorly at the polls, but in any case another military coup (this time led by Luis Garcia Meza) forced him into exile a third time.

Transition to democracy
When democracy was restored in 1982, Lechín and the other leaders of the FSTMB and COB returned to the political arena. In his restored position as top labor leader in the country, he strongly criticized the economic policies of president Hernán Siles Zuazo (1982–85), coming close to toppling his beleaguered regime with crippling strikes and other non-cooperation measures. Lechín also vigorously opposed the neoliberal administration of Víctor Paz Estenssoro, who served his fourth term from 1985 to 1989. 

The closure of most of the country's tin mines by Paz Estenssoro (due to declining production and the collapse of world prices) led to considerable in-fighting in the unions. In 1987, Lechín—now aged 73—retired from the leadership of the FSTMB and was voted out as head of the COB. He was replaced in the FSTMB by Filemón Escobar and by Genaro Flores in the COB. 

Juan Lechín Oquendo died in August 2001, at the age of 87.

Legacy
A controversial but undeniably important historical figure, Lechín was reviled by many and followed almost blindly by others.  A major criticism used against him is that he tended to de-stabilize precisely those regimes that were friendliest to the interests of the working class (Paz Estenssoro, Torres, Siles Zuazo between 1982 and 1985), while being quite deferential to the most hardline right-wing governments (Barrientos, Banzer, Garcia Mesa), at least until he could get safely out of the country.

References

1914 births
2001 deaths
People from Pacajes Province
Vice presidents of Bolivia
Presidents of the Senate of Bolivia
Bolivian people of Lebanese descent
Revolutionary Workers' Party (Bolivia) politicians
Revolutionary Nationalist Movement politicians
Revolutionary Party of the Nationalist Left politicians
Bolivian trade union leaders
20th-century Bolivian politicians
Executive Secretaries of the Bolivian Workers' Center